Princess Jeonghye (정혜공주, 貞惠公主; lit. "the virtuous and kind princess") of the Dae clan (737–25 May 777), was a princess of Balhae as the second and eldest-living daughter of King Mun (Dae Heummu) who was taught by Dunshi Yueli (敦诗悦礼) in her early years.

According to her tombstone and epitaph, she was married and had at least a son, but both of her husband and son died before her in the 4th year of Boryeok era (777) at the age of 40. In 780, she was buried in the western Jilleung (진릉, 珍陵), Seowon (서원, 西原), which nowadays is known as part of Ancient Tombs at Longtou Mountain, Jilin, China, along with a monument of her was erected in the same year too. During her mourning period, her father was said to be very sad and didn't go out for the court affairs. 

In August 1949, scholars from the Yanbian University know some information about Jeonghye's life following the founding of her tombstone and epitaph in the Yujing Mountain, Jilin with all of characters were imitated from the Tang dynasty's writing system. According to some Chinese news, Princess Jeonghye's tomb was built from a square stone with 1.5 m high, about 2 m deep, also 2.8–2.9 m long from north to south and 2.7–2.8 m long from west to east.

See also 
 Ancient Tombs at Longtou Mountain

References
정혜공주(貞惠公主) on Encyclopedia of Korean Culture .
정혜공주(貞惠公主,737~777) on Doosan Encyclopedia .

Balhae people
Korean princesses
737 births
777 deaths
8th-century Korean women